State Route 36 (SR 36) is a  state highway, broken in two segments.  In Unicoi County, it serves as the hidden concurrency of U.S. Route 19W; in Washington and Sullivan counties, it serves as a stand-alone secondary road connecting the cities of Johnson City and Kingsport.

Route description

Segment 1

SR 36 begins in Unicoi County as the unsigned companion route of US 19W at the Tennessee-North Carolina state line. US 19W/SR 36 goes west as a narrow 2-lane highway through rural mountainous areas before curving to the north and having a y-intersection with SR 352 (Old US 23). The highway winds its way north to Temple Hill, where they interchange with I-26/US 23 (Exit 43). Here, US 19W becomes concurrent with I-26/US 23 while SR 36 comes to an end.

Segment 2

Washington County

SR 36 begins in Washington County in Johnson City at a y-intersection with US 11E/US 19W/SR 34. SR 36 then heads northwest as an undivided 4-lane highway and has an interchange with SR 381 before leaving Johnson City and continuing northwest. It passes through Boones Creek, where it has an intersection with SR 354, before passing through Oak Grove and Spurgeon, where it has an intersection with SR 75 which provides access to Gray to southwest and the Tri-Cities Regional Airport and Blountville in the northeast. SR 36 then narrows to 2-lanes before crossing into Sullivan County.

Sullivan County

SR 36 then continues northeast, paralleling the South Fork Holston River to Colonial Heights, where it has an interchange with Interstate 81 (exit 59). SR 36 then widens to 4-lanes again and enters Kingsport and has an interchange with SR 93. SR 36 then passes through a major business district, where it becomes concurrent with SR 126, before passing through several neighborhoods and curving to the west. SR 126 then splits off just west of downtown before SR 36 passes straight through downtown Kingsport. SR 36 then has an intersection with SR 355, where the highway turns north again and has an interchange with US 11W/SR 1. SR 36 then continues north through several neighborhoods before coming to an end at an intersection with SR 346 at the interchange with US 23/SR 137, less than a mile from the Tennessee-Virginia state line.

History

US 23 was established in 1930 with a complete concurrency with SR 36, from the North Carolina state line to the Virginia state line; going through Erwin, Unicoi, Johnson City and Kingsport. In 1952, US 23 was rerouted southwest of Ernestville, along SR 81 through Flag Pond and Sam's Gap into North Carolina; its old alignment remained part of US 19W/SR 36.

In 1970, The first segment of a four-lane freeway, designated SR 137, was opened between Johnson City and Kingsport. Over the following decade, SR 137 continued being extended at both ends until in 1982, when AASHTO approved US 23 relocation onto the freeway, leaving behind its old alignment to SR 36 from north of Johnson City to near the Virginia state line. In December 1985, I-181 was established, truncated SR 137 north of US 11W, while SR 36 replaced as new concurrency south of US 11E; all signs and exit numbers were based on US 23 designation. In 1988, AASHTO approved an extension of I-26 from North Carolina to I-81, on contingent upon the completion and certification of interstate standards in North Carolina, which happened in August 2003. Following the new designation, both SR 36 and SR 81 was removed of their concurrencies with US 23. In March 2007, the remaining spur of I-181, from I-81 to US 11W, was switched to I-26.

Major intersections

References

External links
 

036
Transportation in Unicoi County, Tennessee
Transportation in Washington County, Tennessee
Transportation in Sullivan County, Tennessee